David Oliver (January 8, 1942 – June 6, 1982) was an American soul singer best known for the quiet storm radio hit, "Ms" as well as his composition "Friends & Strangers", which was covered by Ronnie Laws in 1977. He also recorded the first version of the Cecil Womack song "Love TKO", releasing it as an album track on Here's To You in 1980.

Biography
Born January 8, 1942, in Orange County, Florida, United States, to Jamaican parents, David Oliver did not begin singing until high school at the age of 15. All through high school and college, he sang in various groups. After a stint in the Air Force, he re-located to Los Angeles in 1967 and joined a group called Five Days & Three Nights. They were discussing a contract with Motown Records, but after negotiations fell through, the group disbanded.

By 1972, Oliver would go on to record background vocals on Redbone's Already Here album and he then sang with Mighty Joe Hicks's band during the mid-70s. He was signed to Mercury Records in 1977, recording four albums all produced by Wayne Henderson, of The Crusaders.

In 1978, the song "Ms", from his first album, reached number 13 on the R&B Singles chart, but one of his best self-penned songs was "I Wanna Write You a Love Song" on his follow-up LP. In 1980, he recorded a song by Cecil Womack, "Love TKO", that was missed by record buyers at the time of release, but later became a major hit for Teddy Pendergrass.

Death
David Oliver died in the Orange County, Florida city of Winter Park on June 6, 1982, reportedly from a seizure at the age of 40.

Discography
Jamerican Man - Mercury Records, 1977
Mind Magic - Mercury Records, 1978
Rain Fire - Mercury Records, 1979
Here's To You - Mercury Records, 1980

References

External links
 David Oliver at Discogs
 David Oliver at Soulwalking
 "Liner Notes – David Oliver", No Skips No Scratches, November 29, 2010.

1942 births
1982 deaths
American people of Jamaican descent
American rhythm and blues singers
Mercury Records artists
20th-century American singers
20th-century American male singers